Rondón or Rondon is a surname of Hispanic, Portuguese or French origin. The name may refer to:

People

Sports 
Alexander Rondón (born 1977), Venezuelan football player
Ángel Rondón (born 1997), Dominican baseball player
Antonio Senzatela born Antonio Senzatela Rondón (born 1995), Venezuelan baseball player
Bruce Rondón (born 1990), Venezuelan baseball player
Cindy Rondón (born 1988), Dominican volleyball player
Gilberto Rondón (born 1953), American baseball player
Héctor Rondón (born 1988), Venezuelan baseball player
Mario Rondón (born 1986), Venezuelan footballer
Salomón Rondón (born 1989), Venezuelan footballer
Vicente Rondón (1938–1992), Venezuelan boxer

Other people 
Cândido Rondon (1865–1958), Brazilian military officer and Amazon explorer
Diosdado Cabello born Diosdado Cabello Rondon (born 1963), Venezuelan politician
, Venezuelan photographer; see World Press Photo of the Year, 1962
Juan Rondón (fl. 1843), Puerto Rican politician
Mariana Rondón (born 1966), Venezuelan cinema director, screenwriter, producer and visual artist 
Rafael Ángel Rondón Márquez (1898–1966), Venezuelan writer and historian
Ponciano Rondón (1930-2017), Abogado Dominicano, Fundador y primer presidente Colegio Dominicano de Notarios, Pasado Gran Maestro Gran Logia de la República Dominicana
Micky Bane (born as Miguel Angel Rondón (1979-) Peruvian voice actor and writer.

Places

Brazil
Marechal Cândido Rondon, a municipality in the state of Paraná
Marechal Rondon International Airport, Cuiabá
Rondon do Pará, a municipality in the state of Pará
Rondônia, a state
Rondon, Paraná, a municipality in the state of Paraná

Colombia
Puerto Rondón, a town and municipality in the Arauca Department
Rondón, Boyacá, a town and municipality in Boyacá Department

Animals
Rondon's marmoset
Rondon's tuco-tuco

Cuisine
Rondón or Run down, an Afro-Caribbean dish present in Latin American Cuisine
 Rodon (disambiguation)